Gävledala is Sveriges Television's regional news programme for Gävleborgs and Dalarnas län. The programme has been shown since January 1994, and is broadcast from Falun.

External links
 Gävledala at svt.se

Sveriges Television
Sveriges Television original programming
Swedish television news shows
Mass media in Falun